Christian Pospischil (born 14 May 1985) is a German footballer.

References

External links

Christian Pospischil at Fupa

1985 births
Living people
German footballers
Borussia Mönchengladbach II players
Kickers Offenbach players
Sportfreunde Siegen players
TuS Koblenz players
SC Fortuna Köln players
Rot-Weiss Frankfurt players
2. Bundesliga players
3. Liga players
Association football midfielders
SC Hessen Dreieich players